The United Nations Economic and Social Council has 54 member states which are elected by the United Nations General Assembly for overlapping three-year terms, with terms ending on 31 December of the third year. Seats on the Council are based on United Nations Regional Groups, with fourteen seats allocated to the African Group, eleven to the Asia-Pacific Group, six to the Eastern European Group, ten to the Latin American and Caribbean Group, and thirteen to the Western European and Others Group.

Membership by regional group

African Group

Asia-Pacific Group

Eastern European Group

Latin American and Caribbean Group

Western European and Others Group

Non-members 
The list is a summary of all countries that have never been a member of United Nations Economic and Social Council.

See also
 United Nations Regional Groups
 List of United Nations member states
 List of members of the United Nations Security Council
 List of members of the United Nations Commission on Human Rights

References

External links
 Official Document System of the United Nations – source of UN electoral records

United Nations Economic and Social Council